Kreimer is a surname. Notable people with the name include:

 Aimée R. Kreimer (born 1975), American cancer epidemiologist
 Dirk Kreimer (born 1960), German physicist

See also 

 Disappearance of Asha Kreimer